The Sheriff Road–Capitol Heights Line, designated Route F14, is a bus route that operates Monday to Saturday that is operated by the Washington Metropolitan Area Transit Authority between New Carrollton station of the Orange Line of the Washington Metro and Naylor Road station of the Green Line of the Washington Metro. The line operates every 30-35 minutes during rush hours and 50 minutes at all other times. Trips are roughly 60 minutes to complete.

Background
Route F14 operates Monday through Saturday between 4:39 AM to 8:52 PM on weekdays and 5:02 AM to 8:52 PM on Saturdays. The line connects New Carrollton to Temple Hills without having to take Metrorail or enter Washington DC. It connects multiple neighborhoods to various Metrorail stations. A portion of the F14 routing between Capitol Heights station and Addison Road station along East Capitol Street is replaced by the A12 on Sundays.

Route F14 currently operates out of Landover Division.

F14 stops

History
The F14 began operation as the Sheriff Road Line under the Washington Marlboro & Annapolis Motor Lines Inc. (WM&A) in 1951, to operate between the Mayfair neighborhood in Northeast Washington D.C. and Glenn Dale Hospital in Glenn Dale, Maryland, mostly operating along Kenilworth Terrace, Sheriff Road, and Palmer Highway. F14 was eventually acquired by WMATA on February 4, 1973.

1978 Changes
On December 3, 1978 shortly after Deanwood and New Carrollton stations opened, F14 was rerouted to operate between New Carrollton and Deanwood mostly operating along Annapolis Road, Whitfield Chapel Road, Palmer Highway, Sheriff Road, Addison Road, and Minnesota Avenue. The segment of F14's routing on Sheriff Road NE & Eastern Avenue NE, was replaced by a new route U4. The F14's loop inside the Mayfair neighborhood was also replaced by route U2. The segment of F14's routing between the intersection of Palmer Highway and Whitfield Chapel Road and Glenn Dale Hospital, was replaced by route T12.

1981 Changes
On January 4, 1981, after both Addison Road and Capitol Heights station opened, route F14 was rerouted to operate between New Carrollton station & Bradbury Heights (Ridge Road SE & Southern Avenue SE), instead of operating to Deanwood station. The F14 would keep its original route between New Carrollton and the intersection of Addison Road & Sheriff Road in Chapel Oaks, then was rerouted to operate along Addison Road, and East Capitol Street and serve Capitol Heights station when operating towards Bradbury Heights. The route would enter Capitol Heights station bus bays when operating to New Carrollton. 

The F14 would then remain on East Capitol Street, which would become Central Avenue , then turn onto Addison Road, then serve Addison Road station. The line would then operate along Central Avenue, Larchmont Avenue, Marlboro Pike, and Bowen Road, to reach its Bradbury Heights terminal at the intersection of Ridge Road SE & Southern Avenue SE. The line would operate on its same routing back to New Carrollton.

The segment of F14's routing between the intersection of Addison Road & Sheriff Road and Deanwood station, was taken over by route R12.

1993 Changes
On December 11, 1993, routes F13 and F14 swapped their routing. the F14's terminal at New Carrollton station, was relocated from the western side of the station, to eastern side of New Carrollton. During the same time, F14 was rerouted to operate between New Carrollton and the intersection of Martin Luther King Jr. Highway & Belle Haven Drive, via the Glenarden neighborhood and Landover Mall. Route F13 operated along Ellin Road, Harkins Road, Annapolis Road, and Whitfield Chapel Road.

2001 Changes
On January 13, 2001, when Naylor Road station opened, route F14 was extended from Bradbury Heights to Naylor Road station via Southern Avenue and Branch Avenue. The line was also renamed to the Sheriff Road-Capitol Heights Line.

2014 Proposed Changes
In 2014, WMATA proposed to reroute the F14 by turning left on Landover road from Brightseat road to serve a portion of the A12 route before turning back onto MLK highway where the A12 was proposed to be extended to New Carrollton station via Brightseat Road. Service between Brightseat and Landover road and Brightseat and Martin Luther King Jr. Highway will be discontinued and replace by extended route A12.

References

F14